Melissa Comin De Candido (born 28 July 1983) is an Italian figure roller skater. She is an eight-time World medalist (2005, 2006, 2009, 2010, 2011 gold, 2008 silver, 2004, 2007 bronze), a one-time European medalist (2002 bronze) and a six-time Italian Champion.

References

Living people
1983 births
Italian roller skaters
Place of birth missing (living people)
People from San Vito al Tagliamento
Sportspeople from Friuli-Venezia Giulia